Alois Swatosch (born 27 August 1910; date of death unknown) was an Austrian boxer who competed in the 1936 Summer Olympics. In 1936 he was eliminated in the first round of the lightweight class after losing his fight to Simon Dewinter.

External links
Alois Swatosch's profile at Sports Reference.com

1910 births
Year of death missing
Lightweight boxers
Olympic boxers of Austria
Boxers at the 1936 Summer Olympics
Austrian male boxers
20th-century Austrian people